Uniccon Group is a Nigerian-based tech company founded by Chuks Ekwueme. The company is known for its development of Omeife - Africa's first humanoid robot.

History 
The company was created in 2020 by Chuks Ekwueme. In April, two years after the company was founded, it launched a cybersecurity application known as Lossless Security to curb cybercrime and stave off threats to national security. The cybersecurity application is said to be worth $40million.

Omeife 
Omeife is a female-looking humanoid robot that was developed by Uniccon Group. The multilingual humanoid is known as Africa's first humanoid robot and is programmed to speak Pidgin, Yoruba, English, French, Arabic, Kiswahili, Hausa, Igbo and Afrikaans.

Omeife was first conceptualized in 2020 and built as a female Igbo character. The robot is powered by artificial intelligence with deep learning and understanding of the African culture and behavioral patterns.

Partnerships 
In December 2022, the Canada Trade Commissioner from Global Affairs Canada visited Uniccon Group's headquarters in Abuja to explore areas of possible collaboration worth $12.6Billion.
In January 2023, The National Information Technology Development Agency (NITDA) partnered with Uniccon Group to achieve the Federal Government’s digital literacy goal of attaining ninety-five percent digital literacy in Nigeria by 2030.

References